Acoustic meatus may refer to:
 Internal acoustic meatus (or internal auditory meatus)
 External acoustic meatus (or ear canal)